Angelini is an Italian surname. Notable people with the surname include:

Alberto Angelini (born 1974), Italian Olympic water polo player
Anacleto Angelini (1914–2007), Italian-born Chilean businessman
Anthony Angelini (born 1994), American entrepreneur 
Annibale Angelini (1812–1884), Italian painter and scenographer
Arnaldo Maria Angelini (1909–1999), Italian engineer and professor of Electrotechnics
Claudio Angelini (1943–2015), Italian correspondent for the RAI; director of the Italian Cultural Institute in New York
Costanzo Angelini (1760–1853). Italian painter
Donald Angelini (1926–2000), American mobster; caporegime with the Chicago Outfit
Fiorenzo Angelini (1916–2014), Italian Roman Catholic cardinal
Giordano Angelini
Giovanni Angelini
Giuseppi Angelini (sculptor) (1735–1811), Italian sculptor
Giuseppi Angelini (bishop) (1810–1876), Italian bishop
Maria Lea Pedini-Angelini (born 1954), San Marino politician; Captain Regent of San Marino 1981
Mary Pat Angelini (born 1954), American politician from New Jersey; state legislator since 2008
Nando Angelini (born 1933), Italian actor
Norm Angelini (1947–2019), former Major League Baseball pitcher
Pietro Angelini
Sara Angelini (born 1987), Venezuelan model
Scipione Angelini (1661–1729), Italian painter of the Baroque era
Tito Angelini (1806–1878), Italian sculptor in Naples

Italian-language surnames